ADFS may refer to:

 Active Directory Federation Services in Microsoft Windows server operating systems
 Advanced Disc Filing System, a file system implemented in Acorn and RISC OS computers
 Advanced Distributed File System, a defunct IBM file system project
 Apple DOS File System, a file system for Apple II microcomputers